The Sturgeon River is a river that springs near Lady Evelyn-Smoothwater Provincial Park in the Timiskaming District in Ontario, Canada. It flows  in a mostly south-easterly direction through Sudbury and Nipissing Districts before it empties into Lake Nipissing on the north shore.

The river is provincially significant recreational river with some 65 sets of rapids, mostly rated CI and CII that can be run all season.

Ontario Power Generation operates a hydroelectric plant on the river at Crystal Falls. From 1848 to 1879, the Hudson's Bay Company operated a fur trading post called Sturgeon River House at the mouth of this river (now turned into a local museum). Up until the middle of the 20th century, the river was used to transport logs to sawmills on Lake Nipissing. The lower part of the river is prone to flooding. In 1979 the area around the community of Field experienced a disastrous flood that prompted all residential homes to be relocated.

The upper (northerly) part of the Sturgeon River is protected in the Sturgeon River Provincial Park. It is managed by Ontario Parks.

Geography

The river features a continually changing landscape, from the Temagami highlands, with bedrock outcrops and long slender lakes to narrow river channels, rapids and shallows, eventually turning to sandy shores.

Tributaries

Smokey Creek
Tomiko River
Pike River
McCarty Creek
Hebert Creek
Temagami River
Azen Creek
Wawiashkashi Lake (Grassy Lake)
Manitou River
Kabikotitwia River (Ess Creek)
Obabika River
Chiniguchi River (Murray Creek)

+ very many nameless creeks

Hydroelectricy
The Sturgeon River system contains 7 dams and 2 hydroelectric power stations (Crystal Falls and West Nipissing).

See also
List of rivers of Ontario

References

External links

Ontario Parks official website - Sturgeon River
Friends of Temagami

West Nipissing
Rivers of Nipissing District